Vrani is a commune in Caraș-Severin County, western Romania with a population of 1,070 people. It is composed of three villages: Ciortea (Csorda), Iertof (Hévér), and Vrani.

The commune is located in the southwestern part of the county, on the border with Serbia.

References

Communes in Caraș-Severin County
Localities in Romanian Banat